Fotis Karagiolidis (born 28 August 1987) is a Greek professional footballer who plays as a goalkeeper for Super League 2 club Asteras Vlachioti.

Honours
AEK Athens
Football League: 2014–15 (South Group)
Football League 2: 2013–14 (6th Group)
Greek Cup: 2015–16

Volos
Football League: 2018–19

External links
 
 Myplayer.gr Profile
 http://www.aekfc.gr/pld/fotis-karagkiolidis-43094.htm?lang=el&path=963348155

1987 births
Living people
Greek footballers
Greek expatriate footballers
Association football goalkeepers
Football League (Greece) players
Atromitos F.C. players
Rodos F.C. players
AEL Kalloni F.C. players
AEK Athens F.C. players
Olympiacos Volos F.C. players
Volos N.F.C. players
Expatriate footballers in Germany
Footballers from Ptolemaida
Asteras Vlachioti F.C. players